New Town Central Park, or Hongqiao New Town Central Park, is a 130,000-square-meter park located at 2238 Yan'an Xi Lu (延安西路2238号) in the Changning District's Hongqiao Development Zone, in Shanghai, China. It opened in 2000 in pursuit of "the harmony between human beings and nature" and features 115 plants species and a 52,000-square-meter grassland. The park borders the Shanghai Oil Painting and Sculpture Institute and Liu Haisu Art Gallery. According to City Weekend, the park is popular among "local white-collar professionals who work and live in nearby Gubei and its surrounding areas". The China Internet Information Center called the park "an ideal place for nearby Shanghainese to escape from a day's hard work and return to the happiness of nature".

The park features a bust of Mahatma Gandhi (due to Australian sculptor Drago Marin Cherina), a statue of Charlie Chaplin, and a statue of Ma Zhanshan.

References

External links

 
 Hongqiao New Town Central Park master plan, Shanghai, People's Republic of China at WorldCat

Changning District
Parks in Shanghai